The 2015 North Dorset District Council election took place on 7 May 2015 to elect members of North Dorset District Council in England. This was on the same day as other local elections. All 33 seats were up for election, in 19 different wards. The Conservative Party stayed in overall control of the council.

Election result 
The Conservatives increased their majority, with a gain of 4 councillors since 2011, at the expense of the number of Liberal Democrat and Independent councillors, who both lost 2 councillors respectively.

References

2015 English local elections
May 2015 events in the United Kingdom
2015
2010s in Dorset